Ian Westbrook (born June 2, 1983), better known by his stage name Loose Logic, is an American hip hop emcee from California.  At his parents insistence he began piano lessons at the age of 8. His career started when the song he recorded as a high school senior, "The O.C. Anthem", was widely downloaded.  In 2006 he was nominated as "Best Hip Hop Artist of the Year" by the Orange County Music Awards. He describes his work as "poetry over music".

Discography

Albums
 One Story - 2004
 Before The Storm - 2007
 Logistics - 2010
 Perception - 2014
 Reflections - 2017
 Conception - 2022

Mixtapes
 Never Die Vol.1 - 2007
 Eternal - 2008
 Loosid Dreams - 2010
 Loosid Dreams Vol. 2: Awoken Orbits - 2012
 Loosid Dreams 2.5 - 2015
 The Vault - Cypher Sessions - 2016

EP's
 Open Door Policy EP - 2015

Collaborative albums
 The Vault - 2012 (featuring Kollision, Damon 'Mota' Ortiz, Wez Nilez, et al.)
 The Fraternity: Dark Arts Of The Iron Age - 2017

Singles
 Suit Up - Feat Kenny (Horseshoe Gang) & Irawnic - 2019
 Why Would I? - Feat. Enkay47 - 2019
 Keep It Real - Feat. Coulter - 2019
 Lemme Know - 2021
 Not Responsible - Feat. Be the Knowledge - 2021

References

External links

 Loose Logic Official Website
 Loose Logic at HipHop Archief (Dutch)

1983 births
American male rappers
Living people
Musicians from Orange County, California
Rappers from California
Underground rappers
21st-century American rappers
21st-century American male musicians